Belonuchus is a genus of large rove beetles in the family Staphylinidae. There are more than 30 described species in Belonuchus.

Species
These 38 species belong to the genus Belonuchus:

 Belonuchus agilis
 Belonuchus alternatus Sharp, 1885
 Belonuchus amplus Blackwelder
 Belonuchus arizonicus Casey
 Belonuchus bidens Sharp, 1885
 Belonuchus boops Sharp, 1885
 Belonuchus boxi Blackwelder
 Belonuchus bugnioni Fauvel, 1901
 Belonuchus cacao Blackwelder
 Belonuchus cifuentesi Rodríguez & Navarrete-Heredia, 2016
 Belonuchus cognatus Sharp, 1885
 Belonuchus danforthi Blackwelder
 Belonuchus dejectus Sharp, 1885
 Belonuchus docilis Sharp, 1885
 Belonuchus dominicus Blackwelder
 Belonuchus ephippiatus Say, 1834
 Belonuchus hispaniolus Blackwelder
 Belonuchus jacobianus Casey
 Belonuchus laticeps Casey
 Belonuchus mimeticus Sharp, 1885
 Belonuchus moquinus Casey
 Belonuchus oakleyi Blackwelder
 Belonuchus pallidus Casey
 Belonuchus panamensis Sharp, 1885
 Belonuchus pictipennis Sharp, 1885
 Belonuchus pollens Sharp, 1885
 Belonuchus punctiventris Casey
 Belonuchus quadrifer Casey
 Belonuchus rufipennis (Fabricius, 1801)
 Belonuchus rufoniger Fauvel, 1895
 Belonuchus similis Sharp, 1885
 Belonuchus simplex Sharp, 1885
 Belonuchus stenoderus Sharp, 1885
 Belonuchus texanus Casey
 Belonuchus trinitatus Blackwelder
 Belonuchus variolosus Solsky, 1870
 Musicoderus cephalotes Sharp, 1885
 Musicoderus gracilis Sharp, 1885

References

Further reading

External links

 

Staphylininae
Articles created by Qbugbot